John N. Wilson is an Indian politician. He was elected to the Lok Sabha, lower house of the Parliament of India as a member of the Indian National Congress.

References

External links
Official biographical sketch in Lok Sabha website

India MPs 1952–1957
India MPs 1957–1962
Lok Sabha members from Uttar Pradesh
1895 births
20th-century deaths
Year of death missing